Juan Guillermo Gutiérrez Acosta (born 21 June 1964) is a Chilean former professional footballer who played as a forward for clubs in Chile and Mexico.

Club career
Gutiérrez came to Colo-Colo youth system in 1977 and stayed with the club until 1988, winning the league titles in 1983 and 1985. He also won the Copa Chile in 1985 and 1988, scoring the winning goal in the last.

Abroad, Gutiérrez played for Mexican club Morelia from 1990 to 1992, where he coincided with his compatriot José Letelier.

His last club was Audax Italiano in the 1994 Segunda División de Chile.

International career
He took part of Chile at under-20 level in a team coached by Carlos Campos.

Post-retirement
Gutiérrez graduated as a PE teacher at the University of Chile, working after as football coach at both the Diego Portales University and the Alliance française. 

He has worked as head of the youth systems of Colo-Colo (2002–08), Santiago Wanderers (2008–09) and Universidad de Chile (2011–12).

He also has served as sport manager of Colo-Colo (2012–15) and Santiago Wanderers (2015–16).

In 2018, he assumed as coach of the team of USACH.

Honours
Colo-Colo
 Chilean Primera División (2): 1983, 1985
 Copa Chile (2): 1985, 1988

Unión Española
  (1): 1989

References

External links
 
 

1964 births
Living people
Footballers from Santiago
Chilean footballers
Chilean expatriate footballers
Chile under-20 international footballers
Chilean Primera División players
Colo-Colo footballers
Unión Española footballers
Coquimbo Unido footballers
Liga MX players
Atlético Morelia players
Primera B de Chile players
Audax Italiano footballers
Chilean expatriate sportspeople in Mexico
Expatriate footballers in Mexico
Association football forwards
Chilean football managers